Bozbash (Tat: guşto buzbaş) is an Iranian dish consisting of meat stew (also described as a soup) popular in Armenia, Azerbaijan and Iran.

History and etymology 
Bozbash is a word of Azeri Turkish origin. It may be derived from Azeri Turkish boz ("light gray") and bash ("head"), which in turn may point to the light color of the dish when its cooked. However, Mohammad R. Ghanoonparvar notes that "no scientific etymology" has been offered to this effect by Gerhard Doerfer.

Bozbash is the Azeri Turkish name of the Iranian dish abgoosht-e sabzi. Ghanoonparvar notes that bozbash was introduced "relatively late" into Iranian cuisine; Mirza Ali-Akbar Khan, the chef of Naser al-Din Shah Qajar (1848–1896), was reportedly the first to mention it. He classified it as part of a group of meat stews and soups, often eaten cold.

Ingredients and preparation 
Ghanoonparvar notes in relation to bozbash:

In Armenian cuisine, there is a special kind of bozbash not commonly seen, Shoushin bozbash, made from lamb, quince, apple, and mint. This variation of bozbash is "practically unknown outside the Caucasus".

References

Sources
 
 
 

Lamb dishes
Armenian soups
Azerbaijani soups
Iranian soups
Azerbaijani stews
Iranian stews